Los Guardianes del Amor is a Mexican band formed in 1992 and managed David Alberto Uribe Roman. They are the Grupero act with the most nominations for Latin Grammy Award for Best Grupero Album with five, but have never won the award.  The band's five members are Arturo Rodriguez, Oscar Saúl Cervantes, Daniel Poplawsky, Pablo Calderón and Ernesto Gracia.

Discography

Albums
1993 - Cuatro Palabras

 01 - Los Ángeles Lloran
 02 - Amor se Escribe con Llanto
 03 - Cuatro Palabras
 04 - No se te Hizo
 05 - Chiquitita
 06 - Azúcar
 07 - Mi Gran Amor y un Amigo
 08 - Historia de un Amor
 09 - Piscatungaita
 10 - Déjame Secar tus Lágrimas
 11 - Soledad
 12 - Mamá Soltera

1995 - Camino al Cielo

 01 - Corazón Romántico
 02 - Adiós para Salvar tu Honor
 03 - Qué Daría Yo
 04 - Ya lo sé Todo
 05 - Canción Inconclusa
 06 - Muchachita
 07 - En el Nombre del Padre
 08 - Para que no me Olvides
 09 - Para qué Quiero un Corazón
 10 - No Debí Dejarte ir
 11 - No Puedo más
 12 - Adiós con Adiós se Paga
 13 - Propiedad Privada
 14 - Un Amor Entre Dos

1996 - Por Siempre y para Siempre

 01 - El Perro, el Gato y Yo
 02 - Ella
 03 - Quien como Tú
 04 - Soledad
 05 - Jardin de Rosas
 06 - Me Voy a Enamorar
 07 - Que te Perdone Dios
 08 - No somos Nada
 09 - Cuando Dije que te Amaba
 10 - Que Difícil es
 11 - Pajarillo
 12 - Aleluya por tu Llegada
 13 - Tus Guardianes
 14 - Voy a Cantar por no Llorar

1997 - Te Amo Todavía

 01 - Cien Abriles
 02 - El Hechizo
 03 - Enséñame a Olvidarte
 04 - Si Quieres Verme Llorar
 05 - Que la Gente Juzgue
 06 - Quisiera que Fuera un Sueño
 07 - El Regreso de su Amor
 08 - Si me Ves Llorar
 09 - Te Amo Todavía
 10 - En tu Sonrisa
 11 - Bésame un Poquito más
 12 - Aquel Diario

1998 - Lo más Romántico de Ayer con los más Románticos de Hoy

 01 - Palabras Tristes
 02 - Serenata sin Luna
 03 - Me Siento Solo
 04 - Esclavo y Amo
 05 - Nunca más Podré Olvidarte
 06 - Y Volveré
 07 - Una Lágrima y un Recuerdo
 08 - Dame un Beso y Dime Adiós
 09 - Deja de Llorar Chiquilla
 10 - Lágrimas Amrgas
 11 - Yo se que te Acordarás
 12 - A que le Tiramos
 13 - Debut y Despedida
 14 - Titanic (mi Alma te Seguirá)

1999 - Un Pedazo de Luna

 01 - Principio o Fin
 02 - Mi Tesoro
 03 - Sin Despedirnos
 04 - Quítame la Libertad
 05 - Niña
 06 - Que Mal me Pagas
 07 - Un Pedazo de Luna
 08 - Mi Razón de Vivir
 09 - Quiero Perder la Memoria
 10 - Si no Regresas
 11 - Contigo
 12 - Por Siempre y para Siempre

2000 - Éxitos en Vivo

 01 - Presentación
 02 - Para que Quiero un Corazón
 03 - Los Angeles Lloran
 04 - Quien como Tú
 05 - El Perro, El Gato y Yo
 06 - El Hechizo
 07 - Chiquitita
 08 - Popurrí - Yo Sé que te Acordarás - Deja de Llorar Chiquilla
 09 - Principio o Fin
 10 - Mi Corazón Continuará (My Heart Will Go On)
 11 - Si no Regresas
 12 - Cien Abriles
 13 - Amor se Escribe con Llanto
 14 - Palabras Tristes
 15 - Corazón Romántico
 16 - Cuatro Palabras
 17 - Yerba Mala

2010- Un Millón de Lágrimas

 01 - Me Falta Valor
 03 - Llevatela (mi Amigo)
 04 - Te Busco
 05 - Tu Angel Guardian
 06 - Para Volver a Amarte
 07 - Sospechas de mi
 08 - Sabes
 09 - No Vivo más sin Ti
 10 - Hoy te Quiero Tanto

2014- Muriendo de Frio

 01 - Te Extraño
 02 - En un Rincón del Cielo
 03 - Lloro
 04 - Muriendo de Frio
 05 - Quisiera
 06 - Olvidando
 07 - Después de un Mal Amor
 08 - Te Sigo Amando
 09 - Tengo que Olvidarte
 10 - Abre tu Corazón

2015- Me Enamoré de un Ángel

 01 - Como Yo te Amo
 02 - Te he Querido Olvidar
 03 - Dímelo
 04 - Para que Baile mi Pueblo
 05 - El Resto de mi Vida
 06 - Me Enamoré de un Ángel
 07 - Dejamos Morir el Amor
 08 - Quien va a Decir Adiós
 09 - No le Digas
 10 - Globo sin Gas
 11 - La Noche no Basta
 12 - Vuelvo a Decir te Amo
 13 - Te he Querido Olvidar (Versión Salsa)
 14 - Te he Querido Olvidar (Versión Cumbia)
 15 - Te he Querido Olvidar (Serenata)

2011- Olvidarte Nunca

 01 - Bebiendo Lágrimas
 02 - Corazón en Ruinas
 03 - Uno, Dos, Tres
 04 - Si me Enamoro más
 05 - Olvidarte Nunca
 06 - Cuando tus Besos Vuelvan
 07 - Perdóname (por no Saber Decir te Amo)
 08 - Amores Idos
 09 - No Podría Olvidarte Jamás
 10 - La Carta (Una Carta)
 11 - Bebiendo Lágrimas (Versión Romántica)

2013 - Decórame el Corazón

 01 - Decórame el Corazón
 02 - No Soy Perfecto
 03 - Basta de Lágrimas
 04 - Dividido
 05 - Ella se Fue
 06 - Quiero Ser Yo
 07 - Solo los Tontos Lloran
 08 - La Chica es para mi
 09 - Otro Amor Igual
 10 - Dinamita Pura
 11 - No Soy Perfecto (Balada)

2009 - Amor no me Ignores

 01 - La Niña Está Triste
 02 - Amor no me Ignores
 03 - Quiero Dormir Cansado
 04 - Desde que Tú te Has Ido
 05 - Insaciable Amante
 06 - Déjame Llorar
 07 - Amohada
 08 - Estabas tan Linda
 09 - Vivir sin Aire
 10 - Locura Automática

2010 - Mis Favoritas

 01 - El Perro, El Gato Y Yo
 02 - Cuatro Palabras
 03 - Corazón Romántico
 04 - Sin Despedirnos
 05 - Yo Sé Que Te Acordarás
 06 - Cien Abriles
 07 - Principio O Fin
 08 - Palabras Tristes
 09 - Si Quieres Verme Llorar
 10 - Ya Lo Sé Todo
 11 - El Hechizo
 12 - Mi Tesoro
 13 - Muchachita
 14 - Amor Se Escribe Con Llanto

2010 - Tesoros De Colección

Disco 1

 01.Adiós Con Adiós Se Paga 	
 02.Amor Se Escribe Con Llanto 	
 03.Cien Abriles 	
 04.Cuando Dije Que Te Amaba 	
 05.Cumbia Si Me Ves Llorar 	
 06.Debut Y Despedida 	
 07.El Regreso De Su Amor 	
 08.No Somos Nada
 09.Mi Gran Amor Y Un Amigo
 10.Me Siento Solo
 11.Pajarillo
 12.Quiero Perder La Memoria
 13.Soledad
 14.Un Pedazo De Luna
 15.Una Lágrima Y Un Recuerdo

Disco 2

 01.Palabras Tristes 	
 02.Cuatro Palabras 	
 03.Mi Tesoro 	
 04.El Perro, El Gato Y Yo 	
 05.Voy A Cantar Por No Llorar 	
 06.Aleluya Por Tu Llegada 	
 07.Aquel Diario 	
 08.Azúcar 		
 09.Bésame Un Poquito Mas
 10.Dejame Secar Tus Lágrimas
 11.Jardin De Rosas
 12.Lágrimas Amargas
 13.Los Angeles Lloran
 14.Mamá Soltera
 15.No Se Te Hizo

References

Mexican musical groups